The Patria Grande Front is a leftist political front in Argentina founded by activist and social leader Juan Grabois. It was founded in October 2018, ahead of the 2019 Argentine general election, in support of the candidacy of Cristina Fernández de Kirchner and in opposition to the government of Mauricio Macri. As of October 2020 it did not count with official party status nationwide.

Since 2019 it has been part of the Frente de Todos, a peronist coalition formed to support the candidacy of Alberto Fernández (in whose ticket Fernández de Kirchner stood as candidate for vice-president). Following the Frente de Todos's victory, the Patria Grande Front became represented in the national cabinet with the appointment of Elizabeth Gómez Alcorta as Minister of Women, Genders and Diversity.

Patria Grande counts with minor representation in the lower chamber of the National Congress, with only three national deputies: Itai Hagman, Federico Fagioli, and Natalia Zaracho. The name of the front derives from the concept of Patria Grande.

Background
The Patria Grande Front was founded on 27 October 2018 at a rally held in Mar del Plata, headed by activist and social leader Juan Grabois. The front is a confluence of several social and political organizations, including Vamos, Movimiento Popular La Dignidad, Tres Banderas, and Nueva Mayoría. According to Grabois, the front stands for the "critical reivindication of the popular cycle in Latin America and Argentina".

The front was formed with the intention of backing the candidacy of former president Cristina Fernández de Kirchner ahead of the 2019 general election. In July 2019, when Fernández de Kirchner declined running for president and instead endorsed Alberto Fernández while remaining in his ticket as candidate for vice-president, Patria Grande joined the newly formed Frente de Todos and supported Alberto Fernández's candidacy.

Ideology and principles
The majority of the leaders are young, feminist and have a leftist background.

They were never part of the traditional political parties, and developed a grassroots militancy in public education, the university, shantytowns and some unions.

Electoral performance

President

Congress

References

External links
Official website

2018 establishments in Argentina
Feminist parties
Kirchnerism
Peronist parties and alliances in Argentina
Political parties established in 2018
Political party alliances in Argentina
Socialist parties in Argentina